Orbit insertion is the spaceflight operation of adjusting a spacecraft’s momentum, in particular to allow for entry into a stable orbit around a planet, moon, or other celestial body. This maneuver involves either deceleration from a speed in excess of the respective body’s escape velocity, or acceleration to it from a lower speed.

The result may also be a transfer orbit. There is e.g., the term descent orbit insertion. Often this is called orbit injection.

Deceleration
The first kind of orbit insertion is used when capturing into orbit around a celestial body other than Earth, owing to the excess speed of interplanetary transfer orbits relative to their destination orbits. This shedding of excess velocity is typically achieved via a rocket firing known as an orbit insertion burn. For such a maneuver, the spacecraft’s engine thrusts in its direction of travel for a specified duration to slow its velocity relative to the target body enough to enter into orbit. Another technique, used when the destination body has a  tangible atmosphere, is called aerocapture, which can use the friction of the atmospheric drag to slow down a spacecraft enough to get into orbit. This is very risky, however, and it has never been tested for an orbit insertion. Generally the orbit insertion deceleration is performed with the main engine so that the spacecraft gets into a highly elliptical “capture orbit” and only later the apocenter can be lowered with further decelerations, or even using the atmospheric drag in a controlled way, called aerobraking, to lower the apocenter and circularize the orbit while minimizing the use of onboard fuel. To date, only a handful of NASA and ESA missions have performed aerobraking (Magellan, Mars Reconnaissance Orbiter, Trace Gas Orbiter, Venus Express, ...).

Acceleration
The second type of orbit insertion is used for newly launched satellites and other spacecraft. The majority of space launch vehicles used today can only launch a payload into a very narrow range of orbits. The angle relative to the equator and maximum altitude of these orbits are constrained by the rocket and launch site used. Given this limitation, most payloads are first launched into a transfer orbit, where an additional thrust maneuver is required to circularize the elliptical orbit which results from the initial space launch. The key difference between this kind of maneuver and powered trans-planetary orbit insertion is the significantly lesser change in velocity required to raise or circularize an existing planetary orbit, versus canceling out the considerable velocity of interplanetary cruise.

Alternatives to rockets
Although current orbit insertion maneuvers require precisely timed burns of conventional chemical rockets, some headway has been made towards the use of alternative means of stabilizing orbits, such as ion thrusters or plasma propulsion engines to achieve the same result using less fuel over a longer period of time. In addition, research into the use of electrically conducting space tethers to magnetically repel the Earth's magnetic field has shown some promise, which would virtually eliminate the need for fuel altogether.

References

Spacecraft propulsion
Spaceflight concepts